Eudendrium armstrongi is a marine species of cnidaria, a hydroid (Hydrozoa) in the family Eudendriidae. The type locality is Japan at 800m depth.

References

Eudendrium
Animals described in 1909